The 2018 World RX of Portugal was the second round of the fifth season of the FIA World Rallycross Championship. The event was held at the Pista Automóvel de Montalegre in Montalegre, Vila Real.

Qualifying

Semi-finals

Semi-Final 1

Semi-Final 2

Final

Standings after the event

 Note: Only the top five positions are included.

References

|- style="text-align:center"
|width="35%"|Previous race:2018 World RX of Barcelona
|width="40%"|FIA World Rallycross Championship2018 season
|width="35%"|Next race:2018 World RX of Belgium
|- style="text-align:center"
|width="35%"|Previous race:2017 World RX of Portugal
|width="40%"|World RX of Portugal
|width="35%"|Next race:2021 World RX of Portugal
|- style="text-align:center"

Portugal
World RX